Prorella leucata is a moth in the family Geometridae first described by George Duryea Hulst in 1896. It is found in North America from California through Colorado, Maine, Montana, Oregon and Utah to British Columbia.

The wingspan is about 20 mm. The wings are pale creamy, blotched with blackish along the costa. Of these patches, a rectangular, pre-apical one and a median one just interior to the discal spot are the most prominent. Adults are on wing from June to September.

References

Eupitheciini
Moths of North America
Fauna of the Sierra Nevada (United States)
Moths described in 1896